The Fairchild AC-119G Shadow and AC-119K Stinger were twin-engine piston-powered gunships developed by the United States during the Vietnam War. They replaced the  Douglas AC-47 Spooky and operated alongside the early versions of the AC-130 Spectre gunship.

Design and development
By late 1967, the idea of the fixed-wing gunship had been proven so successful, the United States Air Force was having a difficult time keeping up with demand.  The newer AC-130s that had been created under Project Gunship II were effective, but were being mostly used for armed reconnaissance and interdiction of the Ho Chi Minh Trail.  Furthermore, the C-130 airframe was in active service as a transport, vital to the war effort in Southeast Asia. The Air Force desperately needed a new gunship to replace the vulnerable and underpowered AC-47 in the close air support role, as well as supplementing the AC-130 in attacking targets on the Ho Chi Minh Trail.

The Fairchild C-119 Flying Boxcar presented an obvious choice, having been phased out of front-line service in favor of the C-123 and C-130, and with the stock of available airframes in U.S. Air Force Reserve being sufficient. In February 1968, under the USAF program Project Gunship III, 26 C-119Gs were converted to AC-119G standard, initially taking on the name "Creep", but later assigned the callsign "Shadow".

In addition, Fairchild-Hiller, which was contracted for all the conversions, converted another 26 C-119Gs into AC-119Ks, primarily for the "truck hunter" role over the Ho Chi Minh Trail. These aircraft were called "Stingers" primarily in reference to the two M61 Vulcan 20-mm cannons they carried in addition to the AC-119G's four GAU-2/A miniguns. The AC-119K could be visually distinguished by the addition of two General Electric J85 turbojet engines in underwing pods. The conversions were completed at Fairchild-Hiller's facility in St. Augustine, Florida.

Project Gunship III, being a follow-on to the success of the AC-130 series, meant that the AC-119 was a more advanced aircraft in both its iterations than the AC-47. Even the TIC AC-119G featured some of the most up-to-date electronic countermeasures and radar equipment, as well as more basic technology, including an AVQ-8 xenon light, a night observation sight, and an LAU-74/A flare launcher.

The AC-119K, designed to hit trucks on the Ho Chi Minh Trail, was more advanced. Included in the conversion was the AN/APN-147 Doppler navigation radar, AN/AAD-4 forward looking infrared, AN/APQ-133 side-looking beacon tracking radar and AN/APQ-136 search radar.

The armament scheme for both aircraft was simpler than that of the AC-130.  The AC-119G had a total of four GAU-2A/A miniguns in SUU-11A/A pods, all on mounts similar to those used on early AC-47s. Like late-model AC-47s, these were soon changed to the purpose-built MXU-470/A minigun modules.  The AC-119K, needing a more powerful and longer range "punch" to take out vehicles, featured two M61 20-mm cannons in addition to the four miniguns of the AC-119G.

Operational history

By November 1968, the aircraft had deployed to Vietnam and joined the 14th Special Operations Wing at Nha Trang Air Base.  The AC-119Gs were placed in the 71st Special Operations Squadron which was formed from the activated 71st Troop Carrier Squadron, of the Air Force Reserve located at Bakalar Air Force Base in Columbus, Indiana. When the 71 SOS returned to continental USA in 1969, the gunships were taken over by the newly formed 17 SOS.
 
The AC-119Ks were placed in the 18th Special Operations Squadron.  With the addition of the two types, the 14 SOW for a time in 1968 was flying eight different aircraft from ten different bases in South Vietnam.  The 14 SOW was inactivated in 1971. Limited numbers continued to be operated out of Thailand as late as the fall of 1972, but the AC-119 was phased out shortly after from the US Air Force.  The AC-119G and 119K continued to serve with the Republic of Vietnam Air Force (RVNAF) until the Fall of Saigon in 1975.  During the Vietnam War, only five AC-119 Gunship IIIs were lost to all causes.

Operators

 
Republic of Vietnam Air Force
 
United States Air Force
 14th Special Operations Wing – Nha Trang Air Base, South Vietnam
 17th Special Operations Squadron 1969–1971
 18th Special Operations Squadron 1969–1971
 71st Special Operations Squadron 1968–1969
 (Detachments at Tan San Nhut, Phan Rang and Phu Cat AB)
 56th Special Operations Wing – Nakhon Phanom Air Base, Thailand
 18th Special Operations Squadron 1971–1972

Surviving example
 AC-119G Shadow, AF Ser. No. 53-3144, is on display at the Air Commando Heritage Park at Hurlburt Field, Florida.

Specifications (AC-119G)

Gallery

See also

References

Notes

Bibliography 

 Hobson, Chris. Vietnam Air Losses, USAF/USN/USMC, Fixed-Wing Aircraft Losses in Southeast Asia, 1961–1973.  North Branch, Minnesota: Specialty Press, 2001. .
 Petrie, Bill. "AC-119G Shadow (USAF AC-119 Gunships)".  AC-119 Gunship Association, updated: 12 January 2006.Retrieved: 11 April 2007.
 Petrie, Bill. "AC-119K Stinger' (USAF AC-119 Gunships)".  AC-119 Gunship Association, updated: 27 February 2006. Retrieved: 11 April 2007.
 Project CHECO. Contemporary Historical Evaluation of Combat Operations: Fixed Wing Gunships in Southeast Asia, Retrieved: 22 November 2012.

External links
 AC-119 Gunship Association web site
 Fairchild AC-119K – National Museum of the United States Air Force
 C-119 on display at Former Atterbury AAF/Bakalar AFB/Columbus Municipal Airport, Columbus Indiana  www.IndianaMilitary.org

C-119, Fairchild
Aircraft first flown in 1968
C-119, A
High-wing aircraft
Twin piston-engined tractor aircraft
Twin-boom aircraft
Gunships